Heather Langham (born 11 July 1989) is an Australian field hockey player.

References

1989 births
Living people
Australian female field hockey players
Place of birth missing (living people)
21st-century Australian women